Pirates of Venus is a science fantasy novel by American writer  Edgar Rice Burroughs, the first book in the Venus series (also called the "Carson Napier of Venus series"), the last major series in Burroughs's career (the other major series were Tarzan, Barsoom, and Pellucidar). It was first serialized in six parts in Argosy in 1932 and published in book form two years later by Edgar Rice Burroughs, Inc. The events occur on a fictionalized version of the planet Venus, known as "Amtor" to its inhabitants.

The novel contains elements of political satire aimed at communism. The novel's villains, the Thorists, start a revolution in the nation of Vepaja for their own good only, cheating the uneducated masses and killing or driving away those doctors and other highly educated that form the foundation of the society. Throughout the book the Thorists remain distant and unreal, and those few that the hero Carson Napier meets are often stupid or incompetent. The Kalkars, villains of Burroughs' other novel The Moon Maid, were also modeled on the Russian Communists.

Plot

Chapter 1
Carson Napier

When the author receives a letter saying a woman in white will come to him on the night of the thirteenth, he dismisses it as nonsense. Jason Gridley calls, and the author visits him to discuss the latest news about von Horst, Tarzan, David Innes, Captain Zuppner and Abner Perry in Pellucidar. The woman appears on the thirteenth, walking through a closed door. She tells him "he" awaits a reply. Aided by his secretary Ralph Rothmund, the letter is found and a reply  is sent. A few days later Carson Napier shows up at Tarzana, telling the story of his life including how he grew up in India, learning telepathy from the Hindu mystic Chand Kabi, how he lived with his mother's grandfather John Carson, and how he lost his mother. Revealing an intent to fly a rocket to Mars, he fades from view only to enter through the door again. He used telepathy for the meeting to ascertain they can uphold telepathic communication so the author may become the medium through which he tells the story of his adventures. Before returning to his rocket on Guadalupe Island, Napier leaves the author in charge of his personal fortune.

Chapter 2
Off for Mars

Arriving at Guadalupe, Carson finds everything has been made ready under the surveillance of his friend Jimmy Welsh. Jimmy begs for Carson to take him along, but Carson refuses. After a final inspection (during which the rocket ship and plans for the journey are described) Carson bids his workers farewell and takes his place in the rocket. At first, everything appears to go well, but after two hours signs indicate that the rocket is moving off course. Eventually, Carson realizes that he forgot to take the Moon's gravity into account. Two days later it is clear that his new course caused by the Moon's gravity assist will take him towards the Sun and certain death. On the thirtieth day he spots a crescent.

Chapter 3
Rushing toward Venus

The crescent turns out to be Venus. It becomes clear the rocket is going to hit the planet. Venus is said to be unable to support life, but Carson does not give up. As the rocket enters the atmosphere he opens its parachutes, then jumps, opening his own parachute. He discovers the air is breathable. Falling through two thick layers of clouds he is unaware of his surroundings (except for a faint luminosity from below) until the parachute gets stuck in the branches of a tree. Freeing himself from the parachute he starts descending and soon learns the trees are of enormous proportions. After climbing down a thousand feet he finds a causeway, apparently built by intelligent beings, where he encounters a hideous wild beast. He discovers a door in the bole of a tree. Hearing a voice speaking in a foreign language, he calls for help. The beast attacks, but he temporarily stops it by snaring it with a piece of rope salvaged from the parachute. Fleeing for his life Napier is rescued by three humans, armed with spears, emerging from the door. Taking him inside, the men give him food and a bed. He soon falls asleep.

Chapter 4
To the House of the King

When he wakes up, Carson discovers he is in a city built in the enormous tree boles. During breakfast he tries to learn his first few words of the language. The men of the house are named Duran, Olthar and Kamlot. The women are Zuro and Alzo. After breakfast, the men take him to another house where a man named Tofar leads them to a man called Jong, who appears to have a high social status. Carson is thoroughly examined and placed in the care of a man called Danus. During the following three weeks Carson learns the language, history, and customs of Amtor, as the Venusians call their planet. Danus also shows a map, pointing out different regions of Amtor:  Trabol, Strabol and Karbol. His explanations make it obvious that the Amtoran view of the world is very limited and backward. They think Amtor is the inside of a hemispheric bowl floating on a sea of lava (which occasionally comes out of Venus' volcanoes), with Strabol (the torrid zone) in the center of the bowl and Karbol (the frigid zone of Trabol's hemisphere) on the rim. Neither Strabol nor Karbol have been much explored due to their respective hazards, and Carson realizes Danus is showing him an incomplete and faulty azimuthal projection of either Venus' northern or southern hemisphere. Carson tries to explain that it is the other way around, that they are on the outside of a sphere, and that their surveys should have made clear that the line of latitude bordering the frigid zone should be considerably smaller than the line of latitude bordering the torrid. Danus admits that their surveys do support Carson, but explains that a scientist named Klufar had remedied this apparent discrepancy by inventing and applying the imaginary unit. Carson muses about how crucial astronomy was to Earth navigation and mapping. On Venus, the clouds are seen as protection from the "fire" above; rare rifts in the clouds occasionally expose the "fire" (sun), or, at night, the fire's "sparks" (stars).

Chapter 5
The Girl in the Garden

Carson is in the house of Mintep, king (jong) of Vepaja. Duran, father of Olthar and Kamlot, is of the house of Zar. Zuro is attached to Duran, as Alzo to Olthar. Marriage is unknown on Amtor, but couples are usually loyal. Several officers live to the left of Carson. To the right is a garden with a girl. One day five men creep into the garden. Carson follows, killing three. Guards butcher the others, then throw the bodies from the tree. Danus never mentions the incident. Danus tells the history of the Vepajans: There were four classes who lived happily by the millions on thousands of islands. A criminal, Thor, formed the Thorists, who revolted. Everyone became virtual slaves. Some escaped, forming these classless tree cities. Thorists search for them because they themselves have no intelligent people. Vepajans never get sick or grow old because of a serum. Half their women are sterile. Children are only allowed when someone dies by accident. Carson (now 27) is given blood tests for the longevity serum and is found to be filled with bacteria. He loves swimming, boxing, wrestling, and fencing. He exercises because he is overweight. The girl in the garden watches him. He smiles, she runs away. Carson thinks it might be his beard. Danus gives him a depilatory. Asking about the girl, Carson is told he should not even see her. Carson is a prisoner. His apartment is guarded, and he may not leave.

Chapter 6
Gathering Tarel

Carson gets the longevity serum. Not many doctors are needed on Amtor. One day Carson sees the girl and leaps into her garden. When he touches her arm, he gets slapped, but he declares his love. Carson is summoned before Mintep, the jong. He was suspected as a Thorist spy, but now he is to be trained to collect tarel and hunt. Tarel is the strong, silky fiber from which their cloth and cordage are made. Carson is moved to the house of Duran where he is given primitive weapons. (There is an R-ray gun on Amtor, but the Thorists control the rare elements that produce the ray.) That evening he plays a Vepajan game, "tork," with Zuro and Alzo. On the morning hunt Kamlot and Carson climb high in their tree, go through a little door, then pass to other trees. Tarel turns out to be the web of a spider. Carson saves Kamlot from a giant spider (targo), but Kamlot dies.

Chapter 7
By Kamlot's Grave

While Carson carries Kamlot home for burial, he falls into a spider web and kills the targo. He climbs down to the ground (some trees tower 6000 feet and are 1000 feet around the base). He digs a grave to give Kamlot a "Christian burial" but discovers he is still alive, just paralyzed by the spider's venom. Kamlot describes a basto (a bison with the teeth of a carnivore) and the decimal system of weights and measures. Some trees are marked with numbered nails as a mapping system, and the entire map is memorized by the Vepajans. The variety of trees is described. Kamlot kills a basto, kind of like bullfighting, when Carson suddenly sees a startling sight overhead.

Chapter 8

On Board the Sofal

Five "voo klangan" (the bird-men) capture Carson and Kamlot with wire nooses attached to ropes. They are carried through the air accompanied by klangan singing songs "vaguely reminiscent of Negro spirituals". They have very dark skin and are a mixture of bird and man, having feathers and bat-like wings. They fly for eight hours to the Venusian sea and a ship manned by Thorists. They are questioned and Carson tells them he is a doctor. We also learn that Kamlot's home city is called Kooaad. Thrown into the hold of the ship, Kamlot meets a friend, Honan, with the Amtorian greeting "Jodades" (luck-to-you). They learn that Duare (Doo-ah-ree) has been captured, but held on another ship. Kamlot and Carson are set to polishing the guns on deck. They fire T-rays that destroy everything. They are locked by a master key, which Carson wants. The guns and ship propulsion are explained—lor is the propulsive substance—and element 93 (vik-ro), element 97, element 105 (yor-san) are described (here Burroughs speculates about nuclear fission power). They always sail in sight of land. Honan tells Carson that Duare is "the hope of Vepaja, perhaps the hope of a world."

Chapter 9
Soldiers of Liberty

Tensions ease on the ship; Napier becomes friendly with both crew and captives. Telling stories of Earth, he makes new friends. Gamfor, Kiron, and Zog, who become the nucleus for a rebellion. Meanwhile, Carson learns about the Amtorian compass and sonar. Because the map concepts were skewed, reliance upon the maps was fraught with error—large areas are marked joram (ocean), but Carson believes he knows the location of Thora. Named vookor (captain) among the growing secret rebel faction, Napier later learns from Gamfor that Anoos had reported his suspicions to the ship's captain and that his friend among the ship soldiers had given him a key to the armory. Napier suggest they strike that night, but the hold is sealed when it was usually left open. During the night Anoos is murdered.

Chapter 10
Mutiny

The ship's captain conducts an investigation. Napier's clever reply (said loud enough for the Soldiers of Liberty to hear) suggests Anoos despised the Thorists and was a rabble rouser. They all answer similarly. The captain retires. Napier remarks upon Amtorian time measure. At the seventh hour the mutiny commences. The battle is fierce, Kamlot participates in the attack on the ship's upper decks. The ship's officers are slaughtered, many of the soldiers joining the mutineers. Later, Kodj objects to Napier as vookor, Zog disarms him. Napier plans his assault on the Sovang (where Duare is held) from the Sofal's conning tower. Napier addresses the ship's crew, and Kodj and the malcontents as regards the attack: there will be profit for those who participate.

Chapter 11
Duare

Napier's officers report on the crew's temper through the night, most agree with embarking on piracy as regards Thorian shipping—some wish to go home. Exercising caution, Napier arms the loyal hundred and confines the remainder below. Bringing the Sofal near, the Sovang is boarded. Battle ensues. Napier orders the transfer of the Sovang's prisoners (mostly women) and the removal of the Sofal's malcontents to the other ship. Kamlot later reports the virgin Vepajan princess is on board and is grateful that Napier (upon reply) personally killed the captain who affronted her. Later Napier is summoned to the princess' cabin. He whistles (Amtorian custom instead of knocking) and is astonished to see the princess is the girl from the garden!

Chapter 12
A Ship!

Carson again declares his love, much to the girl's distress and anger saying the Vepajans and her father would immediately kill him. Napier restrains his impulses, questioning her. She pardons his affront due to services rendered, reveals she is not yet nineteen, says they can never speak again, and departs into another room. Amtorian language lesson regarding "sofal" and "sovang" (killer and defender). Kamlot explains majority for Vepajan females (age 20) and penalties of death in particular to royal daughters. Carson reveals his intent to marry Duare, Kamlot responds with sword, then cannot kill his friend. Napier remarks on the differences between both worlds. Kamlot becomes a confused party regarding the possible love between Napier and Duare. Days later Vilor requests audience with Napier to offer his service as guard to the janjong—denied. "Voo notar!" (a ship!). The Sofal pursues the Thorian vessel to take her prize. An ongyan's pennant is displayed (exempt from search) and as the Sofal nears—then presents her guns—Moosko, the ongyan commands his soldiers to repel any boarders.

Chapter 13
Catastrophe

Moosko sends the Yan racing away. Carson pursues in the Sofal. After much T-ray fire, and many casualties on the Yan, Carson catches and boards Moosko's ship. Carson is relieved that those under his command obey him rather than turn to personal looting. After destroying the Yan's guns, Carson allows her captain his freedom with the admonition to tell all he meets that the Sofal is to be obeyed. Moosko is kept hostage, housed in the cabin of Vilor, at Vilor's request. Chasing the Yan has led them near the coast of Noobol. A gale rises. Carson finds an angan with Vilor and Moosko and orders the birdman back to his quarters. Carson then visits Duare who hesitates, then allows him entrance. Carson tells her again that he loves her and Duare tells him she cannot listen. He kisses her by force and she draws her dagger. Carson apologizes and leaves. In the early morning, awakened by storm, Carson discovers Duare missing and fears she may have killed herself because of his assault. Then he finds Vilor and Moosko also missing. The lookout has been murdered. A Vepajan woman, Byea, informs Carson that Vilor was a Thoran spy.

Chapter 14
Storm

A search reveals five klangan also missing. Kamlot, Gamfor, Kiron and Zog meet with Carson and reconstruct the scheme wherein Vilor abducted Duare and Moosko regained his freedom with the help of trusted klangan. Carson orders the Sofal to remain offshore until the gale abates, then launch a rescue party. Leaving the cabin, Carson is swept out to sea. He swims with the waves toward shore. The rough surf betokens death as does eternal swimming. But, Carson concludes, "in the midst of death there is life." Fate washes him past the rocks to a sandy beach. He climbs the inlet wall and sets out across the tableland. Later, hearing fighting, he finds Duare and some klangan beset by manlike creatures. Carson charges, scattering the creatures. One angan remains alive. Duare thanks Carson perfunctorily for saving her from the kloonobargan, a word Burroughs explains. Carson offers pardon to the angan in return for faithful service. They return to the coast. Duare confesses as they travel that the rules forbidding conversation may be relaxed in their present circumstances. Speechless at first, Carson tells her about Earth. At the coast, they build a signal fire. Men on land, led by Vilor and Moosko, come to investigate as does the Sofal. Carson orders the angan to carry Duare to the Sofal; she refuses to leave. Carson grabs her, kisses her, and hands her to the angan. She protests, telling Carson that she loves him as they fly away. Carson is taken captive with that knowledge.

Reception
Wonder Stories in 1934 recommended the novel, saying that "the plot of the story is nothing new, [but] a master of fantasy, such as Burroughs, can . . . keep the story absorbing from the first page to the last". Floyd C. Gale of Galaxy Science Fiction in 1963 said that "despite his usual penchant for coincidence and gratuitously fortuitous happenstances (whew!), his power of invention in the realm of pure adventure remains keen throughout the Venusian series".

Copyright
The copyright for this story has expired in Australia, Canada and the United States, and thus now resides in the public domain in those countries.  The text is available via Project Gutenberg Australia, Faded Page, Canada and Project Gutenberg.

Influence on later writers

Poul Anderson, in the Dominic Flandry novel A Plague of Masters, depicts a community of dissidents and rebels against a tyrannical regime, living on the branches of enormous giant trees - strongly reminiscent of the setting in Pirates of Venus.

References

External links 

 
 
 
Free Ebook from Project Gutenberg of Australia
Edgar Rice Burroughs Summary Project page for Pirates of Venus

1934 American novels
1934 fantasy novels
American science fiction novels
American fantasy novels
Venus novels by Edgar Rice Burroughs
Works originally published in Argosy (magazine)
Novels first published in serial form